This is a list of the NCAA outdoor champions in the 3000 meters steeplechase event.  The event was introduced into the official in 2001 replacing the 3000 meter run.

Champions
Key
A=Altitude assisted

References

External links
NCAA Division I women's outdoor track and field
GBR Athletics

NCAA Women's Division I Outdoor Track and Field Championships
Outdoor track, women
Steeplecase